Josia turgida is a moth of the  family Notodontidae. It is found in Venezuela and possibly Colombia.

Larvae have been reared on Passiflora capsularis and Passiflora rubra.

External links
Species page at Tree of Life project

Notodontidae of South America
Moths described in 1905